Psammocytheridae is a family of crustaceans belonging to the order Podocopida.

Genera:
 Bonaducecythere McKenzie, 1977
 Psammocythere Klie, 1936

References

Podocopida